Mark Muise (born 11 October 1957) is a Canadian businessman and former politician, Muise served as a Member of Parliament from 1997 to 2000. He represented the electoral district of West Nova for the Progressive Conservative Party. He is an insurance agent by career.

Early life and education
Muise graduated from Université de Moncton in 1979 with a Bachelor of Business Administration.

Political career
In the 1997 federal election, Muise defeated Liberal incumbent Harry Verran. Muise was defeated in the 2000 election by Liberal candidate Robert Thibault.

Electoral record

Personal life
Muise is married to Paulette and together they have two grown daughters, Mila and Sara.

References

External links
 

1957 births
Living people
Members of the House of Commons of Canada from Nova Scotia
Progressive Conservative Party of Canada MPs
Université de Moncton alumni